Three Floyds Brewing is a brewery founded in 1996 by brothers Nick and Simon and their father Mike Floyd in Hammond, Indiana. Since 2000, the brewery has been located in Munster, Indiana.  Three Floyds opened a brewpub adjacent to the brewery in 2005. They closed the brewpub in 2020.

In 2011, an article in The Washington Post said that Three Floyds "has won over the beer geek elite", and "has been making the best beers on the planet for four of the past five years—at least according to the more than 1 million beer reviews logged each year on RateBeer.com. (In 2008, it slipped to second place.)"

In 2018, Three Floyds cracked the top 50 list of Brewing companies by sales volume reaching the #39 spot in craft brewery sales and #49 spot in overall brewery sales.

Beers
Three Floyds produces more than a dozen year-round beers as well as numerous seasonal beers.

Dark Lord and Dark Lord Day

3 Floyd's Dark Lord is the brewery's premier barrel-aged beer. Dubbed a "demonic Russian-Style Imperial Stout" brewed with coffee, Mexican vanilla and Indian sugar.  Purchasing a bottle of Dark Lord requires attendance to the brewery's annual "Dark Lord Day" festival which regularly features beer exchanges, heavy metal music and food trucks. A ticket nets attendees four bottles of Dark Lord and a fifth variant flavor of Dark Lord.   Attendance at this event is now limited to 6,000 via pre-sold tickets, after crowd control problems in the past.  As of 2018, Dark Lord sits as one of the top 100 beers in the world according to RateBeer.com.

Distillery and brewery expansion
In 2014 it was announced that plans for a distillery were in the works across the street from the brewery. The distillery will produce gin, rum, vodka and other spirits for sale and tasting. The distillery opened on June 21st, 2019. 

In 2018 plans were unveiled for the expansion of Three Floyds 57,000 sq. ft. facility to a larger, campus-like setting with a bigger brewpub, retail area, office space and parking, as well as a larger brewing facility. Construction is set to begin after Dark Lord Day 2019 with no set timetable for completion.

Collaborations with heavy metal bands 
In 2010, the brewers teamed up with heavy metal band Pelican to brew The Creeper, a doppelbock made in recognition of the band's 10th anniversary. Since then, the brewery has collaborated with several other heavy metal bands, including Mastodon, Skeletonwitch, Exodus, Cannibal Corpse, Amon Amarth, and Pig Destroyer.

Other media 
In 2018, comics writer Brian Azzarello teamed up with the brewery to produce a series of comics produced by Image Comics featuring characters based on Three Floyds beers including the Alpha King. 

Gumballhead the Cat – a punk, anthropomorphic cat – is the namesake of Three Floyds Gumballhead wheat ale.  The fictional feline has his own webcomic, which is written and drawn by Rob Syers, who also created the artwork for the beer packaging.

See also
 Beer in the United States
 Barrel-aged beer

References

External links
Official website

Companies based in Indiana
Beer brewing companies based in Indiana
1996 establishments in Indiana